Khalkhalian may refer to:
 Khalkhalian, Rezvanshahr
 Khalkhalian, Talesh